Clark Edwin Creed (March 5, 1921 – September 7, 2012) was an American football and baseball coach.  He was the second head football coach at the Teachers College of Connecticut—now known as Central Connecticut State University—serving for five seasons, from 1948 to 1952 and compiling a record of 14–18–6.  Creed was also the head baseball coach at the Teachers College of Connecticut from  1946 to 1948, tallying a mark of 24–6.

Creed was born on March 5, 1921, in Ashland, Missouri.  He died on September 7, 2012, in Palm Beach Gardens, Florida.

Head coaching record

Football

References

1921 births
2012 deaths
Central Connecticut Blue Devils baseball coaches
Central Connecticut Blue Devils football coaches
People from Boone County, Missouri